Codex Sangallensis (plural Codices Sangallenses) is the designation of  codices   housed at the Abbey library of Saint Gall in St. Gallen. The codices are index with a continuous arabic number (up to four letters), many of the codices have been digitized through the e-codices project in Switzerland with over 2000 of them freely available online.

Notable Codices Sangallenses include:
 Codex Sangallensis 18 (0130 on the list Gregory-Aland) — fragments of the Gospels of Mark and Luke in Greek; 9th century
 Codex Sangallensis 22, the Golden Psalter of St. Gallen
 Codex Sangallensis 48 (037 on the list Gregory-Aland) — four Gospels in Greek with only one lacunae; 9th/10th century
 Codex Sangallensis 51 (48 on the list Beuron) — four Gospels in Latin; 8th century
 Codex Sangallensis 53 – Also known as Evangelium Longum, a book known mostly for its valuable covers.
 Codex Sangallensis 56 — Diatessaron in Latin; 9th century; copy of the Codex Fuldensis
 Codex Sangallensis 63 — manuscript of Vulgate
 Codex Sangallensis 190 — 12 letters of Ruricius
 Codex Sangallensis 381
 Codex Sangallensis 484
 Codex Sangallensis 878 — grammatical texts, including the Ars minor and Ars maior of Aelius Donatus, the grammar of Priscian, the Etymologiae of Isidore of Sevilla and the grammar of Alcuin
 Codex Sangallensis 907 — manuscript of Vulgate
 Codex Sangallensis 1395 — the oldest manuscript of Vulgate Gospels

Other codices include:
 Codex Sangallensis 904 - an Old Irish manuscript on Latin grammar

See also 
 Codex Monacensis

Medieval manuscripts